Federal Polytechnic, Ado-Ekiti is a polytechnic in Ado Ekiti, Ekiti State, Nigeria. The rector is Engr. Dayo Hephzibah Oladebeye.(Phd).  The school is located along Ado/Ijan Ekiti road, Ado-Ekiti, Ekiti State, Nigeria.

Academics
Federal Polytechnic offers National Diploma and Higher National Diploma, certificate and professional programmes in: architectural technology, urban and regional planning, surveying and geoinformatics, quantity surveying, civil engineering technology, mineral resources and engineering technology, mechanical engineering technology, electrical electronics engineering, computer science, science laboratory technology, glass/ceramics technology, food technology, statistics, Marketing, Accountancy, Banking and Finance, Business Administration and Management, Estate Management, and Office Technology and Management. There are five schools:  Business Studies, Engineering, Environmental Studies, Science and Computer Studies, and the newly established School of Agriculture and Agricultural Technology.

History
The institution opened in January 1977 in Jos, Plateau State, as a college of technology with 350 National Diploma students. The following year it was relocated by the government to Akure, Ondo State, and in 1979 became a polytechnic. In 1982 it was moved again to Ado Ekiti, Akure becoming the location of the Federal University of Technology.  it had more than 10,000 full- and part-time students and approximately 1,500 staff.

According to the rector, the institution has for years had problems with the destruction of agricultural facilities by herders.

In 2015 and 2016 staff at Federal Polytechnic went on strike over a reclassification that reduced their salaries and accusations of corruption. On 8 October 2017 the institution was closed indefinitely after either one or two students were reported to have died, possibly of malaria, and students rioted, destroyed property, and burned down the health centre.  The institution is currently opened and academic activities are ongoing smoothly.

Mission 
To train and develop self-reliant manpower for Sustainable technological development

Vision 
A technological institution disseminating qualitative and Practical knowledge for meaningful contribution to local And national technological development

National Mission For Polytechnic Education In Nigeria 
The mission of Polytechnic Education is to produce knowledgeable and innovative graduates, worthy in character and public service for the technological advancement of the country

Gallery

References

External links
 Official website

Federal polytechnics in Nigeria
Education in Ekiti State
Educational institutions established in 1977
1977 establishments in Nigeria